(Old Irish), spelled  in Modern Irish, is a character from the Ulster Cycle of Irish mythology. She appears in the sagas Tochmarc Emire ("the wooing of Emer") and Aided Óenfhir Aífe ("the death of Aífe's only son"). In Tochmarc Emire she lives east of a land called Alpi, usually understood to mean Alba (Scotland), where she is at war with a rival woman warrior, Scáthach. In Aided Óenfhir Aífe she lives in Letha (the Armorican peninsula), and is Scáthach's sister as well as rival – they are both daughters of Árd-Greimne of Lethra.

Appearances
In Tochmarc Emire the Ulaid hero Cú Chulainn has come to train in arms under Scáthach when a battle breaks against Aífe. Scáthach, fearful of Cú Chulainn's safety, gives him a sleeping potion to keep him from the battle, but a potion that would put most people to sleep for twenty-four hours only knocks him out for an hour, and he joins the fray. Aífe challenges Scáthach to single combat, and Cú Chulainn fights as Scáthach's champion, but before the fight he asks Scáthach what it is that Aífe loves most, which Scáthach reveals is her chariot and horses. They begin to fight, and Aífe shatters Cú Chulainn's sword, at which he cries out that Aífe's chariot and horses have fallen over a cliff. When Aífe turns to look, he overpowers her, throws her over his shoulder, and carries her back to his side. He held his sword at her throat as she begged for her life. He chooses not to kill her, on two conditions: that she cease hostilities with Scáthach and she bear him a son.

When Cú Chulainn returns to Ireland he leaves Aífe pregnant. He gives her a gold ring to give to the child, and instructs her that when he is seven he is to come to Ireland in search of him, but he must not identify himself to anyone. The story is taken up again in Aided Óenfhir Aífe, when the boy, Connla by name, comes to Ireland as Cú Chulainn had instructed, and his precocious prowess alarms the Ulaid. Because he will not identify himself, Cú Chulainn fights and kills him.  When it was too late Cú Chulainn recognised the ring; he had killed his only son.

References

External links
Dun Sgathaich on Skye, said to stand on the site of Dún Scáith

Ulster Cycle
Women warriors
Women in Irish mythology
Armorica